Bryan Pelé (born 25 March 1992) is a French professional footballer who plays as a midfielder.

Career
Pelé made his Ligue 1 debut on 25 August 2013 in a 2–0 away loss against EA Guingamp. He replaced Yann Jouffre after 68 minutes. Ten minutes later, he received a yellow card.

He joined Stade Brestois in January 2015, in a -year contract.

In June 2017, it was announced Pelé had signed a two-year contract with Troyes.

In June 2019, Pelé signed a two-year contract with Ligue 2 side EA Guingamp.

References

External links
 
 

1992 births
Living people
People from Ploërmel
French footballers
Association football midfielders
Ligue 1 players
Ligue 2 players
Cypriot First Division players
FC Lorient players
Stade Brestois 29 players
ES Troyes AC players
En Avant Guingamp players
AEL Limassol players
Sportspeople from Morbihan
Footballers from Brittany
Expatriate footballers in Cyprus
French expatriate sportspeople in Cyprus